Samuel or Sam Wright may refer to:

Government
 Samuel G. Wright (1781–1845), United States Representative from New Jersey
 Samuel C. Wright (1842–1906), American Civil War soldier
 Samuel Wright (Medal of Honor), (1828–1918), American Civil War soldier
 Samuel T. Wright III (born 1955), Associate Justice of the Kentucky Supreme Court
 Samuel Thomas Wright (1887–1948), Canadian wholesale merchant and political figure in Ontario
 Samuel D. Wright (1925–1998), American politician in New York

Sports
 Sam Wright (Australian footballer) (born 1990), Australian rules footballer
 Sam Wright (baseball) (1848–1928), American baseball shortstop
 Samuel Wright (English cricketer) (1869–1947), English cricketer
 Samuel Wright Sr. (1812–1877), English-American cricketer
 Samuel Wright (Jamaican cricketer) (born 1933), Jamaican cricketer
 Sam Wright (English footballer) (born 1997), English footballer

Others
 Samuel Wright (nonconformist) (1683–1746), dissenting divine
 Sam Wright (priest) (born 1959), Dean of Connor since 2016
 Samuel E. Wright (1946–2021), American actor and singer
 Samuel F. Wright, attorney active in veterans issues
 Samuel Hart Wright (1825–1905), farmer, astronomer, botanist, teacher, and almanac editor